Below is a list of episodes of the British television series of Hollyoaks Later, which aired originally on E4 with a repeat on Channel 4

The first series of Hollyoaks Later was originally named Late Night Hollyoaks and first broadcast five episodes over the course of the week beginning 24 November 2008 and ending on 28. It was produced by Lucy Allan, who succeeded Bryan Kirkwood as the Hollyoaks producer in 2009. The series fared well in the ratings and in 2009, a second series was commissioned and broadcast over five nights beginning on 28 September 2009. The second series was produced by Bryan Kirkwood. A third series was soon commissioned and began broadcasting over five nights on the week of 25 October 2010. The third series was produced by Paul Marquess. On 4 March 2011 Channel 4 had commissioned a fourth series due to be broadcast during five nights a week in Autumn 2011. In May 2012, it was announced Hollyoaks Later would be returning for a fifth series.

Episodes

Series 1 (2008)

Series 1 (2008)

Series 2 (2009) 

</onlyinclude/>

Series 4 (2011) 

</onlyinclude/>

Series 5 (2012) 

</onlyinclude/>

Series 6 (2013)

Special (2020)

References

External links
Summary of Hollyoaks Later episodes from E4.com

Lists of British drama television series episodes